Nenad Šarić Brada (10 October 1947 in Rijeka, Yugoslavia – 3 May 2012 in Karlovac, Croatia) was a Croatian musician, best known as the drummer of Novi Fosili.

Biography 

Šarić began with music from elementary school and became a drummer with Jutarnje zvijezde (Morning stars).  Until 1985, he performed with Oliver Dragojević among others.

Death
Šarić died on 3 May 2012, aged 64, from complications of a stroke.

Marriage 
For almost 20 years, he was married to  Sanja Doležal, lead singer of the group Novi Fosili.

See also 
Novi fosili
Sanja Doležal

Sources 

1947 births
2012 deaths
Musicians from Rijeka
Yugoslav musicians
Croatian musicians
Eurovision Song Contest entrants of 1987
Eurovision Song Contest entrants for Yugoslavia